Cadogan is an unincorporated community in Cadogan Township, Armstrong County, Pennsylvania, United States. Cadogan has a post office with ZIP code 16212.

References

Unincorporated communities in Armstrong County, Pennsylvania
Unincorporated communities in Pennsylvania